Mats Johansson (born 28 May 1962) is a retired Swedish football goalkeeper.

References

1962 births
Living people
Swedish footballers
IFK Norrköping players
Örebro SK players
Degerfors IF players
IFK Eskilstuna players
Association football goalkeepers
Allsvenskan players